The 2006 Ondrej Nepela Memorial was the 14th edition of an annual senior-level international figure skating competition held in Bratislava, Slovakia. It took place between September 15 and 16, 2006 at the Ondrej Nepela Ice Rink. Skaters competed in two disciplines: men's singles and ladies' singles. The compulsory dance was the Austrian Waltz. The competition is named for 1972 Olympic gold medalist Ondrej Nepela.

Results

Men

Ladies

External links
 14th Ondrej Nepela Memorial results
 14th Ondrej Nepela Memorial

Ondrej Nepela Memorial, 2006
Ondrej Nepela Memorial
Ondrej Nepela Memorial, 2006